Denis Strauch (24 March 1937 – 10 June 1965) was an Australian rules footballer who played with Carlton in the Victorian Football League (VFL).

Carlton recruited Strauch, a forward, from Eaglehawk in 1957 and he made 19 appearances for them that season. He then found himself on the fringes of selection, only adding 10 more games over the next three years.

He finished his football career at Port Melbourne, where he played until his death, from a tetanus infection, in 1965.

References

1937 births
Australian rules footballers from Victoria (Australia)
Carlton Football Club players
Port Melbourne Football Club players
Eaglehawk Football Club players
Deaths from tetanus
1965 deaths